David Light may refer to:

 David Light (boxer) (born 1991), New Zealand professional boxer
 David Light (cricketer) (born 1944), English former cricketer